Bjarne Lennart "Ödeshögarn" Andersson (28 April 1940 – 11 August 2004) was a Swedish cross-country skier who won a 4 × 10 km relay silver medal at the 1968 Winter Olympics; he finished sixth in the individual 15 km race.

Andersson did his military service in the cavalry in Umeå. He was a Swedish 15 km champion in 1968, and won six national skiing titles in the 3 × 10 km relay between 1966 and 1973. He also won three individual and one team titles in cross-country running. During that time he worked at a petrol station in Mora and was clearing the forest nearby. Later he became a shoe specialist and developed a ski boot model that was named after him. After that he ran his own sports shop specializing in equipment for cross-country skiing and running. In addition, between 1976 and 1980 he coached the national ski team, and in 1983–87 worked as a sports commentator on television. He continued competing in the masters category, and won three world titles in 1997.

Cross-country skiing results
All results are sourced from the International Ski Federation (FIS).

Olympic Games
 1 medal – (1 silver)

World Championships

References

1940 births
2004 deaths
People from Motala Municipality
Cross-country skiers from Östergötland County
Swedish male cross-country skiers
Cross-country skiers at the 1968 Winter Olympics
Olympic cross-country skiers of Sweden
Olympic silver medalists for Sweden
Olympic medalists in cross-country skiing
Medalists at the 1968 Winter Olympics